George Lawrence Fuller (1832–1917) was an Australian farmer, quarry owner and shopkeeper.

Biography 

He was born on 29 November 1832 in Dunmore, Galway, Ireland.

He lived his entire life in Shell harbour district of Kiama, New South Wales, Australia.

He got married to Sarah Cunningham Miller on 20 April 1859 in Kiama, New South Wales. They had 13 children.

He was the father of Colin Dunmore Fuller and George Warburton Fuller.

He died on 2 September 1917 in Kiama, New South Wales, Australia.

Career  

He worked as farmer, quarry owner and shopkeeper. He was also an important community member and was held in high esteem for his contributions to community building in 19th century Australia.

He was the owner of a general store which eventually became the largest business in Kiama, New South Wales. It made him the largest business owner in Kiama, New South Wales.

See also 

 Colin Dunmore Fuller
 George Warburton Fuller

References

Australian farmers
1832 births
1917 deaths